Brăescu is a surname. Notable people with the surname include:

Gheorghe Brăescu (1871–1949), Romanian writer
Smaranda Brăescu (1897–1948), Romanian aviation pioneer

Romanian-language surnames